R-7 regional road (previously known as R-6 regional road) is a Montenegrin roadway.

It serves as extension of  highway, and is a connection between Nikšić and Gacko, Bosnia and Herzegovina.

History

In January 2016, the Ministry of Transport and Maritime Affairs published bylaw on categorisation of state roads. With this bylaw R-6 regional road was shortened on south-east side for around 2 kilometers to start at new route of M-3 highway, and was renamed as R-7 regional road.

Major intersections

References

R-7